Cryptophyllium athanysus, is a species of phasmid or stick insect of the genus Cryptophyllium. It is found in Sri Lanka.

References

Phylliidae
Insects of Asia
Insects described in 1859